Miklós Szalay (born 6 December 1946) is a Hungarian former footballer who played as a midfielder. He was born in Salgótarján, Nógrád County. He competed at the 1968 Summer Olympics in Mexico City, where he won a gold medal with the Hungarian team.

References

External links

1946 births
Living people
People from Salgótarján
Hungarian footballers
Olympic footballers of Hungary
Footballers at the 1968 Summer Olympics
Olympic gold medalists for Hungary
Olympic medalists in football
Medalists at the 1968 Summer Olympics
Association football midfielders
Hungary international footballers
Sportspeople from Nógrád County